St. Benedict is a parish church in Munich, southern Germany, located in the Schwanthalerhöhe ("Westend") of the city.

References 

Benedict
Cultural heritage monuments in Munich